Wakita may refer to:

Wakita (surname)
Wakita, Oklahoma, town in Grant County, Oklahoma, United States